Usually known simply as the Emblemata, the first emblem book appeared in Augsburg (Germany) in 1531 under the title Viri Clarissimi D. Andreae Alciati Iurisconsultiss. Mediol. Ad D. Chonradum Peutingerum Augustanum, Iurisconsultum Emblematum Liber. Produced by the publisher Heinrich Steyner, the unauthorized first print edition was compiled from a manuscript of Latin poems which the Italian jurist Andrea Alciato had dedicated to his friend Conrad Peutinger and circulated to his acquaintances. The 1531 edition was soon followed by a 1534 edition authorized by Alciato: published in Paris by Christian Wechel, this appeared under the title Andreae Alciati Emblematum Libellus ("Andrea Alciato's Little Book of Emblems"). The word "emblemata" is simply the plural of the Greek word "emblema", meaning a piece of inlay or mosaic, or an ornament: in his preface to Peutinger, Alciato describes his emblems as a learned recreation, a pastime for humanists steeped in classical culture.

The Emblemata grew to include over 200 individual emblems and appeared in hundreds of editions, of which probably the best known is that published in Padua by Tozzi in 1621, the Emblemata Cum Commentariis Amplissimis. The "very full commentaries" to which the title refers were written by the French scholar Claude Mignault. Alciato's work spawned thousands of imitations in all the European vernacular languages: secular, religious, or amorous in nature, emblem books were an integral part of European culture for two centuries.

The preface reads in part (translated):

While boys are entertained by nuts and youths by dice, so playing-cards fill up the time of lazy men. In the festive season we hammer out these emblems, made by the distinguished hand of craftsmen. Just as one affixes trimmings to clothes and badges to hats, so it behooves every one of us to write in silent marks. Though the supreme emperor may give to you, for you to own, precious coins and finest objects of the ancients, I myself shall give, one poet to another, paper gifts: take these, Konrad, the token of my love.

Bibliography

External links

Alciato at Glasgow - 22 editions of Alciato from 1531 to 1621, housed at Glasgow University
The Pennsylvania State University English Emblem Book Project
The Memorial University of Newfoundland (Canada) - concise description and texts about Alciato's Book of Emblems
Atalanta fugiens (1617) - A German/Latin emblem book of 50 alchemical concepts, also containing musical fugues, by Michael Maier
Devises et emblemes anciennes & modernes (1699) - Emblem book with motto (superscriptio) in German, French, Latin, and Italian

1531 books
Emblem books